Central Christian Schools is a private Christian school in  Redmond, Oregon, United States. The school has been accredited through the Association of Christian Schools International since 1992, and through the Northwest Accreditation Commission since 2002. The Central Christian Tigers compete in the OSAA Mountain Valley 1A league. Central Christian opened in 1992.

References

High schools in Deschutes County, Oregon
Educational institutions established in 1992
Buildings and structures in Redmond, Oregon
Christian schools in Oregon
Private middle schools in Oregon
Private elementary schools in Oregon
Private high schools in Oregon
1992 establishments in Oregon